The V8SuperTourers Championship was a motor racing series in New Zealand which started in 2012 and folded in 2015. The cars were then absorbed into the NZ Touring Cars championship. 

The car was based on a "Car-of-the-Future" prototype built by Paul Ceprnich of Pace Innovations Australia similar to that of the Australian V8 Supercar series. It was designed to be customised to many different manufacturers vehicles including a Holden VE Commodore, Ford FG Falcon, Toyota Camry or BMW 5 Series. Testing started in April 2010.

The V8SuperTourer Championship was run by V8SuperTourers Limited, a company formed by current NZV8 team owners Mark Petch, Wayne Anderson and Garry Pedersen.

The aim of the company was to build a new V8 touring car, similar to a current Australian V8 Supercar but at less than half the cost. The V8SuperTourer was designed to have performance similar to that of a current Australian V8 Supercar and was designed for both sprint and long distance racing, including a 120-litre capacity fuel cell.

The V8SuperTourer car

Designed and built by Paul Ceprnich of Pace Innovations Australia, the V8SuperTourer prototype uses a Holden VE Commodore body mounted on a purpose-built chassis. The chassis, like the Australian V8 Supercar car of the future (or COTF) project, is built to not only accommodate both the current VE Commodore and Ford FG Falcon bodies, but any other similar sized four-dour production vehicle such a Toyota Camry or BMW 5 Series. Interested vehicle manufacturers of four-door saloon cars of a similar size to the Holden Commodore VE and Ford FG Falcon models can apply to race in the series.

The V8SuperTourer uses a strictly-controlled, one make, all-alloy, fuel injected and dry sumped 7-litre V8 ST engine. The power-plant is derived from the Le Mans Corvette C6.R programme and is hand-built in the United States. It delivers 550 horsepower at 6,800 revs per minute and is expected to have a racing life of 10,000 kilometres before requiring maintenance. This engine is identical to that of the Mosler Automotives current and very successful GT3 sports-car.

The Link Engine Management, G4 Xtreme manages the fuel, ignition and e-throttle, gear shift cuts, performance limiting when parameters go "out of range" as well as supplying data to the Race Technology dash.

The drive-train consists of a triple-plate clutch, which delivers engine torque through a Quaife 6-speed sequential transmission via a one-piece pro-shaft feeding a classic 9 Ford differential, which is fitted with a locked differential, crown wheel carrier assembly in order to provide excellent traction in most conditions.

The rear suspension adopts the proven, yet simple in design and maintenance, three-link live rear axle fitted with camber and toe, CV style, floating rear hubs.

The front suspension is a sophisticated clean sheet, double wishbone layout that is also cleverly symmetrical from left to right, thus reducing spares inventories, etc. Both the front and rear suspension oscillations are dampened by adjustable bump and rebound shock absorbers fitted with adjustable spring platforms.

The rack and pinion power steering assembly is mounted ahead of the engine in order to better optimise the front suspension geometry and the high loads generated under long distance racing events.

The V8SuperTourer uses 10x18 forged alloy wheels carrying 280 x 680 x 18 racing slicks or wet weather radial tyres.

The Brembo brake package, use ventilated 380mm diameter 35mm thick rotors in the front, and 355x32 mm ventilated rotors in the rear. Both the front and rear rotors are fitted with Brembo's super-stiff "forged" billet alloy 6 piston brake callipers, in the front and 4 piston callipers in the rear. This state of the art brake package combines to stop the comparatively light car, which has an all up weight, including driver, of less than 1,300 kg, faster than a current supercar.

Champions

Records

First pole sitter ever: Kayne Scott in 2012 Round 1 at Hampton Downs
First race winner: Greg Murphy in 2012 Round 1 at Hampton Downs
First round winner: Greg Murphy in 2012 Round 1 at Hampton Downs
Most race wins in a row: Greg Murphy in 2014 Race 1 Round 1 Highlands to Race 1 Round 3 Pukekohe (7 Race Wins)
Most podium finishes in a row: Greg Murphy from 2013 Round 7 Race 3 Pukekohe 500 to 2014 Race 3 Round 4 Pukekohe (14 Podiums)

Race wins by driver

Accurate to and including, 2014

Round wins by driver

Accurate to and including, 2014

Podium finishes by driver

Accurate to and including, 2014

Pole positions by driver

Accurate to and including, 2014

Television coverage
Broadcasting rights for the inaugural V8SuperTourer season in 2012 are held by TV3. TV3 will bring free-to-air, same-day, coverage of all seven rounds in 2012 with the third race from each of the sprint rounds and the main race from each of the endurance rounds screening live.

References

Touring car racing series
Auto racing series in New Zealand